The Great Northern Railway (GNR) Class C1 is a type of 4-4-2 steam locomotive. One, ex GNR 251, later LNER 2800, survives in preservation. Much like their small boiler cousins, they were capable of reaching speeds of up to 90 mph (145 km/h). They were also known as Large Atlantics.

Development 
The C1 Class, as it was known under both GNR & LNER classifications, was designed by Henry Ivatt as an enlarged version of what became the LNER C2 Class.  The principle of the design was to produce a powerful, free-steaming engine to haul the fastest and heaviest express trains on the Great Northern. They could thus be seen as the start of the East Coast 'Big Engine' policy. None were ever named.

First engine and improvements 
The first engine, No. 251, was introduced in 1902, with eighty more being built at Doncaster Works between 1904 and 1908. Although they suffered from a number of teething troubles, the Atlantics were generally very successful. They were originally fitted with slide valves, but later gained piston valves, which produced a notable improvement in performance. They were known for reaching speeds of up to 90 miles per hour.

Variants
On the GNR, the classification C1 was used for all of their 4-4-2 tender locomotives, but there was considerable variation within the 116 locomotives making up this group. The LNER divided them into two classes: C2 for the 22 locomotives built in 1898–1903 with boilers of  diameter; and C1 for the remaining 94, which mostly had boilers of  diameter – but there were several locomotives within the latter group that differed significantly from the others.

The "standard" variety of large-boiler C1 was represented by nos. 251, 272–291, 293–301, 1400–20 and 1422–51 built at Doncaster between 1902 and 1908.

No. 292, built at Doncaster in 1904 (but not entering service until 1905), was a four-cylinder compound. The valves were arranged so that the locomotive could work either as a compound or as a four-cylinder simple. This locomotive was withdrawn in 1927 and scrapped in 1928.

No. 1300, another four-cylinder compound, was an experimental locomotive which differed greatly from all of the others. It was built by Vulcan Foundry in 1905, largely to their own design although to Ivatt's specifications. The engine worked as a two-cylinder simple on starting, changing over to compound expansion automatically. A superheater was fitted in 1914, and the engine was rebuilt as a two-cylinder simple in 1917; the new cylinders were outside,  of the type used on class H3, driving the leading coupled wheels. It was withdrawn in 1924.

It was superheated in 1914 and rebuilt in 1920 as a two-cylinder simple with piston valves. It was then generally similar to the standard engines after they had been superheated, and it ran until 1947.

No. 279 was rebuilt in 1915 with four cylinders  utilising simple expansion and driving the rear coupled axle. It was rebuilt back to a two-cylinder simple in 1938, but using  cylinders of the type used on class K2 having the piston valves above the cylinders; in this form it ran until 1948.

No. 1419 (renumbered 4419 in May 1924) was equipped with a booster engine on the trailing axle in July 1923; to accommodate this, the frames were lengthened at the rear, which also allowed a larger cab to be fitted. At the same time, the locomotive was given a superheater and piston valves, in line with others of the class. The booster, being for extra power at very low speeds, were of little use above speeds of 25mph, was removed temporarily between July 1924 and February 1925, and it was permanently removed in November 1935.

Later years 

They were eventually superseded on the heaviest trains by the Gresley A1 Pacifics in the early 1920s. They continued to haul lighter expresses up until 1950, although this did include the Harrogate Pullman for a period during the 1920s and 1930s. They were often called upon to take over trains from failed Pacifics and put up some remarkable performances with loads far in excess of those they were designed to haul. One once took over the Flying Scotsman from a failed A3 at Peterborough and not only made up time but arrived early.

Accidents and incidents

Fourteen people were killed and seventeen were injured.
Three people were killed.

On 15 June 1935, locomotive No. 4411 was hauling a passenger train that was run into by an express passenger train at  due to a signalman's error. Fourteen people were killed and 29 were injured.

The last trip 
Seventeen C1s made it to serve British Railways, albeit for a short time. According to The Railway Magazine, the last engine in service was BR 62822, ex GNR 294.  On 26 November 1950 she hauled a train one way from Kings Cross to Doncaster to mark the end of the C1s. Among the many on board was the son of H.A. Ivatt, Mr. H.G. Ivatt who received one of the builder's plates.  On display at Doncaster was pioneer sister ex GNR 251, already preserved, and a number of modern engines. The return trip to London was hauled by A1 Pacific 60123 named, suitably enough, H.A. Ivatt.

The first becomes the last, No. 251 
Pioneer 251, LNER 2800, had been saved for the UK National Collection even before the last one was withdrawn from revenue service in 1950. Restored to GNR livery, she is the only C1 to survive. She joined preserved sister GNR 990 "Henry Oakley" on two weekends of trips entitled Plant Centenarian in 1953, celebrating the 100th anniversary of the Doncaster Works. On 20 September the two engines, 990 leading, hauled the train from Kings Cross to Doncaster carrying nearly 500. LNER Class A4 2509 Silver Link (BR 60014) brought the train back to London. A similar trip a week later operated from Kings Cross to Leeds with a stop at Doncaster, with the GNR veterans again hauling one leg of the trip. No. 251 steamed poorly on these trips, because the superheater had been removed although the boiler flues had not been replaced with small tubes to compensate. Further trips followed, the last being on 12 September 1954, but it was not until March 1957 that the locomotive was placed in York museum. Since her preservation, the locomotive has spent time on display at the National Railway Museum, the Locomotion museum in Shildon, Bressingham Steam and Gardens and Barrow Hill Engine Shed. As of 2021, the locomotive is currently on a three-year loan to the new Danum Gallery, Library and Museum in Doncaster.

Two C1 boilers, one of which belonged to No. 3287, were discovered at a factory at Essex in 1986 by Steve Dymond and Nick Pigott, the revelation that the boiler once belonged to No. 3287 unknown until 2005 by a pressure washer. The boiler that once belonged to No. 3287 was in good condition and was purchased by the Bluebell Railway for their H2 project while the other boiler was scrapped due to it being in bad condition.

References 

C1
4-4-2 locomotives
Railway locomotives introduced in 1902
Standard gauge steam locomotives of Great Britain
Passenger locomotives